Steven Claus Beering (August 20, 1932 – April 3, 2020) served as president of Purdue University from 1983 to 2000. Previously, he was dean of the Indiana University School of Medicine for nine years.

During his leadership, Purdue's main campus in West Lafayette, Indiana grew by more than 20 buildings. He replaced John W. Hicks and was succeeded by Martin C. Jischke. Beering was well known for his opposition to financial earmarks. In his honor, the former Liberal Arts Education Building (or LAEB), was renamed Beering Hall. He also founded an eponymous scholarship which provides recipients with full tuition and fees, room and board, and expenses for their undergraduate, graduate, and doctoral degrees.

Beering earned a B.S. in 1954 and an M.D. in 1959, both from the University of Pittsburgh. In May 2010, he completed a term as Chairman of the National Science Board.

Beering died on April 3, 2020 at the age of 87. He was interred in 2020 on Slayter Hill alongside his wife, Jane Beering, who preceded him in death in 2015.

References

1932 births
2020 deaths
German emigrants to the United States
Presidents of Purdue University
Indiana University faculty
University of Pittsburgh alumni
University of Pittsburgh School of Medicine alumni
Members of the National Academy of Medicine